Cephalopholis nigripinnis, the blackfin grouper, banded-tail coral-cod, blackfin rockcod, darkfin hind or duskyfin rockcod, is a species of marine ray-finned fish, a grouper from the subfamily Epinephelinae which is in the family Serranidae which also includes the anthias and sea basses. It is found in the tropical Indian Ocean.

Description
Cephalopholis nigripinnis has a body which is less deep than the head is long with the body being around a third as deep as the standard length. The profile between the eyes is convex and the rounded preopercle has a serrated edge and a fleshy lower edge. The maxilla extends beyond the eye. The dorsal fin has 9 spines and 14-16 sodt rays while the anal fin has 3 spines and 8-9 soft rays. The caudal fin is rounded and the pelvic fins do not extend to the anus. This species is an overall red colour becoming darker towards its tail with some spotting and barring, but this is normally rather faint. The tail fin is dark and can be almost black and is covered in small pale spots while the pectoral fins are redat their base and darken towards the margin. In the Comoros Islands there are fish that are coloured almost black to match their dark coloured habitat. There is a prominent brown spot on the opercle. At a maximum total length of  this is a small grouper species.

Distribution
Cephalopholis nigripinnis is distributed in the western Indian Ocean along the eastern coast of Africa from Kenya south as far as Europa Island and South Africa, as well as the Seychelles, Mascarenes. Madagascar and the British Indian Ocean territory. Farther east they are found in the Maldives and off Sri Lamka and in the Andaman Sea south to Sumatra. The only place they are found in Australia is Christmas Island.

Habitat and biology
Cephalopholis nigripinnis is common wherever it occurs and lives in areas with plentiful coral where they feed on small fishes and crustaceans.

Taxonomy
Cephalopholis nigripinnis was first formally described as Serranus nigripinnis in 1828 by the French zoologist Achille Valenciennes (1794-1865). This species has been regarded as a synonymous with Cephalolophis urodeta but is now largely accepted as a valid species. The two taxa are most allopatric but do occur together around Christmas Island where they hybridise.

References

External links
http://www.marinespecies.org/aphia.php?p=taxdetails&id=313075
http://www.fishbase.org/summary/66482
http://eol.org/pages/11043795/details
 

nigripinnis
Fish described in 1828